Gentil Delázari (9 September 1940 – 31 October 2022) was a Brazilian Roman Catholic prelate.

Delázari was born in Brazil and was ordained to the priesthood in 1968. He served as coadjutor bishop of the Roman Catholic Diocese of Sinop, Brazil in 1994 and 1995 and was bishop of the diocese from 1995 until his retirement in 2016.

References

1940 births
2022 deaths
Brazilian Roman Catholic bishops
Bishops appointed by Pope John Paul II
People from Mato Grosso